Ryan Atkins (born 7 October 1985) is an English former professional rugby league footballer who plays as a  for York City Knights in the Betfred Championship and formerly England at international level.

He previously played for the Bradford Bulls in the Super League, and on loan from Bradford at the Wakefield Trinity Wildcats in the top flight. Atkins joined the Wakefield Trinity Wildcats on a permanent deal and later joined the Warrington Wolves in the Super League.

Background
Atkins was born in Pudsey, West Yorkshire, England.
He played rugby league for his local team Stanningley and rugby union for Bramley Phoenix.

Playing career

Bradford
Atkins began his career with Bradford but failed to make a first-team appearance before joining Wakefield Trinity midway through 2006's Super League XI.

Warrington
He signed for Warrington on a three-year deal in September 2009, following Richie Myler from Salford City Reds.

Atkins played for Warrington in the 2010 Challenge Cup Final victory over Leeds.

Atkins played in the 2012 Challenge Cup Final victory over Leeds at Wembley Stadium.

Atkins played in the 2012 Super League Grand Final defeat by Leeds at Old Trafford.
Atkins played in the 2013 Super League Grand Final defeat by Wigan at Old Trafford.
Atkins played in the 2016 Challenge Cup Final defeat by Hull F.C. at Wembley Stadium.
Atkins played in the 2016 Super League Grand Final defeat by Wigan at Old Trafford.

York City
On 15 September 2020, it was announced that Atkins would join York City for the 2021 season.

On 13 November 2020 the RFL announced a three-month ban for Atkins for placing a bet on former club Wakefield Trinity. Atkins retired at the end of the 2021 season.

International career
His impressive club form earned him a call-up and was named in the England training squad for the 2008 Rugby League World Cup.

Honours
League Leaders' Shield: 2
2011, 2016

Challenge Cup: 2
2010, 2012

References

External links

Profile at warringtonwolves.com
SL profile

1985 births
Living people
Bradford Bulls players
English sportspeople of Grenadian descent
England national rugby league team players
English rugby league players
Rugby league centres
Rugby league players from Pudsey
Rugby league wingers
Wakefield Trinity players
Warrington Wolves players
York City Knights players